
Gmina Komańcza is a rural gmina (administrative district) in Sanok County, Subcarpathian Voivodeship, in south-eastern Poland, on the Slovak border.

Ethnically the region's inhabitants include Poles, Pogorzans and Lemkos.

The gmina contains part of the protected area called Cisna-Wetlina Landscape Park.

Villages
Gmina Komańcza contains the villages and settlements of Balnica, Banniczka, Czystogarb, Darów, Dołżyca, Duszatyn, Jasiel, Jawornik, Komańcza, Kulaszne, Łupków, Maniów, Mików, Moszczaniec, Nowy Łupków, Osławica, Polany Surowiczne, Prełuki, Radoszyce, Rzepedź, Smolnik, Surowica, Szczawne, Turzańsk, Wisłok Wielki, Wola Michowa, Wysoczany and Zawadka Morochowska.

Neighbouring gminas
Gmina Komańcza is bordered by the gminas of Baligród, Bukowsko, Cisna, Jaśliska, Rymanów and Zagórz. It also borders Slovakia.

Rural landscape pictures

References
Polish official population figures 2006

Komancza
Sanok County